Magnolia officinalis (commonly called houpu magnolia or magnolia-bark) is a species of Magnolia native to the mountains and valleys of China at altitudes of 300–1500 m.

Identification 
It is a deciduous tree growing to 20 m in height. The bark is thick and brown, but does not fissure. The leaves are broad, ovate, 20–40 cm long, and 11–20 cm broad. The flowers are fragrant and 10–15 cm wide, with 9–12 (rarely to 17) white tepals, and appear from May to June.

The two varieties are:
Magnolia officinalis var. officinalis has leaves with an acute apex.
Magnolia officinalis var. biloba has leaves with a notch at the apex. This variety does not appear in the wild, and is only known in cultivation. It is possibly not a true variety at all, but actually a cultigen instead, though this has yet to be determined.

M. officinalis differs very little from Magnolia obovata; the only difference consistently observed between the two is that the fruit aggregate of M. officinalis has a rounded base, while that of M. obovata has an acute base. Further research may or may not eventually determine if M. officinalis should be treated as a subspecies of M. obovata.

Uses
The highly aromatic bark is stripped from the stems, branches, and roots and used in traditional Chinese medicine, where it is known as hou po (厚朴; thus the common name). The traditional use indications are to eliminate damp and phlegm, and relieve distension.

Today, the bulk of bark used for commercial and domestic use is supplied by plants in cultivation.

Pharmaceutical potential
The bark contains magnolol and honokiol, two polyphenolic compounds that have been demonstrated as peroxisome proliferator-activated receptor gamma (PPAR gamma) agonists and GABAA modulators.

Gallery

References

External links
Magnolia officinalis images in the Arnold Arboretum of Harvard University Plant Image Database
Flora of China: Magnoliaceae (draft account)
 Photos of flowers and foliage

officinalis
Conservation dependent plants
Medicinal plants